Des O'Connor Tonight is a British light entertainment variety show hosted by Des O'Connor. It was originally broadcast on BBC Two from 1977 until 1982, when it moved to ITV from 1 November 1983 until 3 September 1999. 6 further specials were broadcast until 24 December 2002 when it was axed after nearly 26 years.

Transmissions

Series

Specials

External links

1977 British television series debuts
2002 British television series endings
1970s British television talk shows
BBC Television shows
British variety television shows
British television talk shows
Television series by ITC Entertainment
Television series by Fremantle (company)
Television series by ITV Studios
English-language television shows
BBC television comedy
BBC television talk shows
ITV comedy
ITV talk shows
Television shows produced by Thames Television
Television shows produced by Central Independent Television
Television shows shot at Teddington Studios